Pertsev (feminine: Pertseva) is a Russian-language surname. Notable people with the surname include:

Dmitry Pertsev
 Andrey Pertsev, musician of the Russian band Chorny Kofe
Natalia Pertseva, Russian footballer

See also

Pertsov

Russian-language surnames